The school service centre is the model of public french school self-governance, which replaced school boards in 2020, in the province of Québec (Canada), appointed by the Ministry of Education.

Autonomy 
Each one of the 60 centres is administered by a board of directors composed of five parents, five community members, and five staff members.

See also 
Ministry of Education
 Education in Quebec

References

External links
 https://www.cbc.ca/news/canada/montreal/quebec-education-reform-school-boards-1.5457100
 https://www.cbc.ca/news/canada/montreal/bill-40-kills-school-boards-after-175-years-1.5458564
 https://www.cbc.ca/news/canada/montreal/law-40-municipal-buildings-1.5457789